Danny Ramadan (formerly Ahmad Danny Ramadan, born May 31, 1984) is a Syrian–Canadian novelist, public speaker, and LGBTQ-refugee activist who was born in Damascus, Syria. Ramadan's work focuses on themes of immigration, identity, diaspora and belonging. His debut novel, The Clothesline Swing, won multiple awards. Currently, Ramadan lives in Vancouver, British Columbia with his husband.

Writing

Early work 
Ramadan has translated the work of Saudi blogger Raif Badawi to English, released in 2015 by Greystone Books under the title 1000 Lashes: Because I Say What I Think.

Ramadan published two collections of short stories in Arabic while he lived in Egypt. His first collection, Death and Other Fools, was released by Dar Laila in 2004. His second collection, Aria, was released by Dar Malameh in 2008.

The Clothesline Swing 
The Clothesline Swing is Ramadan's debut novel in English. Inspired by One Thousand and One Nights, the novel tells the epic story of two lovers anchored to the memory of a dying Syria. One is a Hakawati, a storyteller, keeping life in forwarding motion by relaying remembered fables to his dying partner. Each night he weaves stories of his childhood in Damascus, of the cruelty he has endured for his sexuality, of leaving home, of war, of his fated meeting with his lover. Meanwhile, Death himself, in his dark cloak, shares the house with the two men, eavesdropping on their secrets as he awaits their final undoing.In its review, titled "The Sweetest Taboo", Winnipeg Free Press stated that the author "has crafted a novel that compels readers to share — vicariously, with his characters — the beauty and history of Syria, the horrors of civil war and the joy, release, and pain of forbidden love." adding that the novel is "an enjoyable if challenging, cultural and historical excursion.".

Publishers Weekly called the work "remarkable" stating that "Ramadan's delicate use of imagery links these narratives, allowing them to reverberate with meaning and emotion.".

"This debut novel from the Vancouver-based Syrian writer reads as many things," writes Kamal Al-Solaylee for Canadian magazine Quill and Quire, "a coming-out memoir, a history lesson, a critique of authoritarianism, a narrative about sharing narratives – but above all, it's a requiem for a dying country and people." The Globe and Mail called the novel "sombre, fantastical, violent and tender," adding that Ramadan's "English-language debut is a gay son's conflicted love letter to Syria."

The Georgia Straight called the narration of Ramadan "fragmented, poetic, and rich with magic realism," adding that the novel "is a lesson in both artistic mastery and human resilience. And, unexpectedly: joy."

The Clothesline Swing won the Independent Publisher Book Awards' Golden Medal in the LGBT category, as well as the Canadian Authors Association's Fred Kerner Award for Best Overall Fiction Book in 2018, was picked among The Globe and Mail's 100 Best Books 2017, and was number 7 of the Toronto Star Top 10 Books of 2017. It was long listed on the CBC's Canada Reads 2018 contest, shortlisted to the Forest of Reading's Evergreen Award 2018, shortlisted for the Lambda Literary Award Gay Fiction category in 2018, and longlisted for Sunburst Award for Excellence in Canadian Literature of the Fantastic.

The Clothesline Swing was translated to Hebrew and released in May 2018 as well as French, to be released in August 2019. The book was re-launched in the UK by British Publisher The Indigo Press.

Salma the Syrian Chef 

His children's book, Salma the Syria Chef, is released in 2020 by Annick Press. The picture book tells the story of newcomer Salma whose mother is struggling to adjust to their new life in Canada. Salma decides to uplift her mother's spirit by cooking a traditional Syrian meal for her, with the help of their new friends in the Welcome Home they are living at.

“Salma is deeply relatable in her determination, frustration, and sensitivity, especially in moments when things do not go as planned," wrote Shannon Ozirny for Quill and Quire. The book was also positively reviewed by Kirkus Reviews who stated that "this beautiful story grasps diversity, exploring resilience, love, friendship, and the meaning of home.". Publishers Weekly praised the book's inclusive messages, and stated that, "Ramadan writes with poetic immediacy about displacement, home, and family."

Activism 
In a Vice Media interview in 2016, Ramadan talked about the underground work he used to do to support and sometimes house queer individuals while he lived in Damascus. He later elaborated on this experience in a 2018 interview and stated "I turned my house [in Damascus] into an underground LGBTQ centre... it was actually quite the loving community until I was arrested for it." Ramadan mentioned in a separate interview to The Media Line, that he was arrested at the airport by Syrian officials and held for six weeks. After his release, he was declared a persona non grata by the Syrian government and as a result he immigrated to Lebanon as a refugee in 2012. Eventually, Ramadan was granted asylum in Canada, and in September 2014 he immigrated to Vancouver, British Columbia. By 2015, Ramadan already began working at Qmunity, a queer resource center in British Columbia. Around the same time Ramadan was working for Qmunity, he started volunteering for the Rainbow Refugee Society which describes itself as, "a Vancouver based community group that helps individuals seeking refugee protection in Canada based on sexual orientation, gender identity, gender expression (SOGIE) or HIV status." While volunteering at the Rainbow Refugee Society, Ramadan helped organize and support the sponsorship of Syrian refugees. Since May 2015, Ramadan has also run an annual fundraiser known as An Evening in Damascus. The goals of the fundraiser are to introduce the community to authentic Syrian culture and heritage, build a safe space for Syrian Queer and Trans refugees to celebrate their identity, offer opportunities to foster friendship and integration between Syrian Queer and Trans newcomers and LGBTQ2+ Canadian community members, and fundraise for private sponsorships. Through the fundraiser, Ramadan has raised over $150,000 for LGBTQ-identifying refugees, and he has helped 23 individuals obtain refugee protection in Canada. Ramadan speaks publicly about issues related to gay Syrian refugees, and he has expressed his views as a speaker at conferences and conventions such as TedxSFU, Qmunity's IDAHOT Breakfast, the Liberal Party Convention, and Six Degrees Conference. Ramadan used to write a bi-weekly column for Daily Xtra between 2012 and 2016, covering topics such as what it's like to live as a refugee in another country, and how to integrate LGBTQ refugees into Canadian society.

Since November 2016, Ramadan has served as Director-at-large for the board of Vancouver Pride Society, and as of 2019, Ramadan now serves as Director for the board of the Rainbow Railroad.

In 2016, Ramadan was honored as the grand marshal of the Vancouver Pride Festival for his work supporting LGBTQ-refugees and newcomers. In 2017, he was awarded the Social Activist StandOut Award by the Vancouver Pride Society for his social-activist work. That same year he was also picked as one of the 25 Top Immigrants to Canada by Canadian Immigrant. In 2018, he was a recipient of the 2018 Bonham Centre Award from the Mark S. Bonham Centre for Sexual Diversity Studies.

Bibliography

References

External links 

Living people
1984 births
Syrian novelists
Syrian emigrants to Canada
People from Damascus
21st-century Canadian novelists
21st-century Canadian short story writers
Canadian male novelists
Canadian male short story writers
Canadian Muslims
Canadian LGBT novelists
LGBT Muslims
Canadian gay writers
Writers from Vancouver
Syrian male writers
Syrian short story writers
21st-century Canadian male writers
21st-century Canadian LGBT people
Gay novelists